Ronald Frankish (6 October 1925 – 17 October 2013) was an Australian cricketer. He played nineteen first-class matches for Western Australia between 1948 and 1953.

References

External links
 

1925 births
2013 deaths
Australian cricketers
Western Australia cricketers
Cricketers from Perth, Western Australia